Calusterone (INN, USAN) (brand names Methosarb, Riedemil; former developmental code names NSC-88536, U-22550), also known as 7β,17α-dimethyltestosterone, is an orally active anabolic-androgenic steroid (AAS) that is used as an antineoplastic agent. It is a 17α-alkylated AAS similar in structure to bolasterone (which is its 7α-isomer).

Calusterone is on the World Anti-Doping Agency's list of prohibited substances, and is therefore banned from use in most major sports.

References

Androgens and anabolic steroids
Androstanes
Hepatotoxins
World Anti-Doping Agency prohibited substances